Seuil-d'Argonne is a commune in the Meuse department in Grand Est in north-eastern France.

Geography
The main village of Seuil-d'Argonne is Triaucourt-en-Argonne. It is the seat of the municipality. To the west is Senard, the second centre of the municipality in the Aisne valley. Aubercy is a hamlet situated in the north-west of the commune. The commune is also crossed by the Marque.

Personality
 Claude Aubery (c.1545-1596), physician, philosopher and theologian.

See also
Communes of the Meuse department

References

Seuildargonne